Tinhosa may refer to two islets in São Tomé and Príncipe:

Tinhosa Grande, an islet in Príncipe Province, São Tomé and Príncipe
Tinhosa Pequena, an islet in Príncipe Province, São Tomé and Príncipe